Cryptandra mutila is a flowering plant in the family Rhamnaceae and is endemic to the west coast of Western Australia. It is a rigid, prickly, much-branched shrub with linear leaves and small sessile clusters of white flowers.

Description
Flowering occurs in July and August.

Taxonomy and naming
Cryptandra mutila was first formally described in 1848 by Siegfried Reissek in Lehmann's Plantae Preissianae from an unpublished description by Christian Gottfried Daniel Nees von Esenbeck. The specific epithet (mutila) means "maimed" or "mutilated", possibly referring to the twisted appearance of the stamens.

Distribution
This cryptandra grows in sand or sandy clay over limestone on river flats and near salt lakes, in coastal areas of the Geraldton Sandplains, Jarrah Forest, Swan Coastal Plain and  Yalgoo bioregions of Western Australia.

Conservation status
Cryptandra mutila is listed as "not threatened" by the Western Australian Government Department of Biodiversity, Conservation and Attractions.

References

mutila
Rosales of Australia
Flora of Western Australia
Plants described in 1848